Harry or Harold Sheppard may refer to:

Harry R. Sheppard (1885–1969), U.S. Representative from California
Harry Sheppard (musician) (1928–2022), jazz vibraphonist
Harold Sheppard (English cricketer) (1888–1978), English cricketer
Harold Sheppard (Scottish cricketer) (1917–1997), Scottish cricketer and solicitor

See also
Harry Shepherd (1903–1988), speedway rider
Harry Shepherd (baseball) (fl. 1930s), American baseball player
Henry Sheppard (born 1952), baseball player
Henry Fleetwood Sheppard (1824–1901), English clergyman
Henry Shepherd (1857–1947), Dean of Antigua